Alice Kunek (born 6 January 1991) is an Australian professional basketball player.

Professional career

WNBL
Kunek began her WNBL career at the AIS alongside fellow up and coming players. She spent three seasons at the AIS, before moving signing with the Bulleen Boomers, where she played for three seasons. In her first season with the Boomers, she helped them take home their inaugural WNBL Championship, averaging 9.9 points per game. In 2013, Kunek left the Boomers and signed with the Dandenong Rangers. In her first season with the Rangers, Kunek averaged a career high 15.9 points per game. After two seasons with the Rangers, she returned to the Melbourne Boomers. Kunek was named captain of the Melbourne Boomers ahead of the 2016-17 season.

On 16 May 2017, Kunek signed with the Perth Lynx for the 2017-18 WNBL season. On 8 November 2017, Kunek was named to the WNBL Team of the Week, after scoring 25 points, including five three-pointers, in her team's victory over the Townsville Fire. On 29 December 2017, Kunek played her 200th career WNBL game.

Overseas
At the conclusion of the 2016/17 WNBL season, she joined French side Lyon Basket féminine for the remainder of their season. Kunek played 10 games with Lyon, averaging 6.3 points and 5.1 rebounds, and helped her side avoid relegation. On 17 January 2018, Kunek signed as an injury replacement for French side Tarbes Gespe Bigorre.

National team
Kunek was a member of the Gems. She was then named to the Gems squad and helped them take home the Gold at the Oceania Under-18 Championship and qualify for the World Championship the following year in Thailand. Playing alongside, Elizabeth Cambage, the team placed fifth. In 2015, Kunek was named to the Opals side for the 2015 FIBA Oceania Women's Championship. She was once again named to the Opals squad, in the lead up to the 2016 Summer Olympics. However, as the squad was dropped down to 17 members, Kunek was cut from the Olympic squad.

Kunek joined the Opals side ahead of the 2017 FIBA Asia Cup, where Australia took home Silver. In December 2017, Kunek was named to the Opals training camp squad ahead of the 2018 Commonwealth Games.

Personal life
Kunek is currently studying a Master of International Business at Deakin University.

See also
 List of Caulfield Grammar School people

References

1991 births
Living people
Australian women's basketball players
Australian expatriate basketball people in France
Dandenong Rangers players
Melbourne Boomers players
Sportswomen from Victoria (Australia)
Universiade medalists in basketball
People educated at Caulfield Grammar School
Basketball players at the 2018 Commonwealth Games
Commonwealth Games medallists in basketball
Commonwealth Games gold medallists for Australia
Universiade bronze medalists for Australia
Forwards (basketball)
Guards (basketball)
Medalists at the 2013 Summer Universiade
People from Box Hill, Victoria
Basketball players from Melbourne
Australian expatriate basketball people in Poland
Tarbes Gespe Bigorre players
Medallists at the 2018 Commonwealth Games